Soyuz TM-20 was the twentieth expedition to the Russian Space Station Mir. It launched Russian cosmonauts Aleksandr Viktorenko, Yelena Kondakova, and German cosmonaut Ulf Merbold.

Crew

Mission highlights

The flight carried 10 kg of equipment for use by Merbold in ESA's month-long Euromir
94 experiment program. During automatic approach to Mir's front port, the
spacecraft yawed unexpectedly. Viktorenko completed a manual docking
without additional incident.

See also

Timeline of longest spaceflights

References

External links
 Spaceflight Mission Report

Crewed Soyuz missions
Spacecraft launched in 1994